The Russian women's national ice hockey team represents Russia at the International Ice Hockey Federation's IIHF World Women's Championships. The women's national team is controlled by the Ice Hockey Federation of Russia. After the 2022 Russian invasion of Ukraine, the International Ice Hockey Federation suspended Russia from all levels of competition.

History
On 1 April 1994, Russia played its first game in Brampton, Canada, losing 1–2 to Switzerland. Three times – at 2001 Women's World Ice Hockey Championships, the 2013 IIHF Women's World Championship and the 2016 IIHF Women's World Championship Russia reached 3rd place by defeating Finland in the bronze medal game.

After the 2022 Russian invasion of Ukraine, the International Ice Hockey Federation suspended Russia from all levels of competition.

Tournament record

Olympic Games

2002 – Finished in 5th place
2006 – Finished in 6th place
2010 – Finished in 6th place
2014 – Finished in 6th place, disqualified
2018 – Finished in 4th place (As Olympic Athletes from Russia women's national ice hockey team)
2022 – Finished in 5th place (As ROC women's national ice hockey team)

World Championship
1997 – Finished in 6th place
1999 – Finished in 6th place
2000 – Finished in 5th place
2001 –  Won bronze medal
2004 – Finished in 5th place
2005 – Finished in 8th place
2007 – Finished in 7th place
2008 – Finished in 6th place
2009 – Finished in 5th place
2011 – Finished in 4th place
2012 – Finished in 6th place
2013 –  Won bronze medal
2015 – Finished in 4th place
2016 –  Won bronze medal
2017 – Finished in 5th place
2019 – Finished in 4th place
2020 – Cancelled due to the coronavirus pandemic
2021 – Finished in 5th place (As ROC women's national ice hockey team)
2022 – Expelled due to the 2022 Russian invasion of Ukraine

European Championship
1995 – Finished in 7th place (won Pool B)
1996 –   Won silver medal

Team

Current roster

A 23-player roster playing for the ROC was announced on 24 January 2022. The roster submitted in the ROC’s preliminary application on 2 February featured only nineteen players. Due to positive COVID-19 test results, previously named goaltender Diana Farkhutdinova, defencemen Angelina Goncharenko and Yekaterina Nikolayeva, and forwards Lyudmila Belyakova and captain Olga Sosina were removed and reserve forward Polina Luchnikova was added to the roster. Goaltender Valeria Merkusheva and defenceman Maria Batalova were expected join the team in Beijing on 3 February. On 3 February, defenceman Yulia Smirnova and forward Landysh Falyakhova were registered and, on 5 February, Maria Batalova was registered and both Angelina Goncharenko and Olga Sosina returned to the official roster.

Head coach: Yevgeni Bobariko

Notable players
Yekaterina Smolentseva
Iya Gavrilova

References

External links

IIHF profile

 
 
Women's national ice hockey teams in Europe